Gjøvik University College (HiG) is a university college in Norway. In January 2016, Gjøvik University College joined with the Norwegian University of Science and Technology (known as NTNU). HiG is now referred to as the NTNU campus in Gjøvik.

College 
Gjøvik University College was established 1 August 1994 in the town of Gjøvik when two governmental colleges Gjøvik College of Engineering and Oppland College of Nursing were combined as part of the a large reform of Norway's colleges. In 2007, Gjøvik University College took over BI Norwegian Business School's operations in the region.

It has approximately 2800 students and 280 employees.  The University College is led by an executive board, and its rector, deans and section heads are hired, as opposed to elected.  The institution has three faculties:

 Faculty of Health, Care and Nursing
 Faculty of Computer Science and Media Technology
 Faculty of Technology, Economy and Management

Profile 

Gjøvik University College is a research-intensive university college.  It is seeking to focus all its activities, research and education on some of Norway's most pressing challenges:

 Challenges to the future welfare of Norway's citizens (particularly challenges in the primary health sector caused by demographic changes Aging of Europe.
 Challenges with respect to the future of value creation in Norway (particularly value creation that is sustainable and competitive).
 Environmental challenges (including sustainability and climate adaptation challenges).  
 Security challenges (in particular related to our digital society, including information security / cyber security challenges).

Study programs 

Gjøvik University College offers a number of study programs in the areas of Health, Computer Science, Engineering, Media Technologies, and Business Management.  Most areas are offered at both Bachelor and Master levels, some also on PhD level.  There are also a number of shorter programs and offers for continued education

The University College has introduced value creation (including innovation, entrepreneurship and quality-increasing processes) as a component in all its study programs.  In addition, it offers a separate bachelor program in Media Management and Innovation.  The Innovatorion is the college's interdisciplinary idea lab, a workshop for the development of ideas and projects where students, researchers and external companies collaborate on projects, mock businesses and real businesses. Participation in a 24-hour ideas competition "Idélab-24" is mandatory for all students.

The University College offers research education in all its faculties.  All master's programs offer paths to doctoral programs, either to one of the college's own programs or in collaboration with other universities. The college has its own PhD programs in computer science and in information security. The college is also a member of several Graduate Schools, including the Norwegian Research School in Technology and the European Graduate School in Technology (EuTec).  The research schools integrate the research education resources of their members, in essence offering their PhD students free flow of services like courses, supervision and industry collaboration.

Gjøvik University College is internationally oriented, with employees of 21 nationalities. Most of the masters programs are offered in English. The students can choose several paths towards a high level of internationalization, for instance taking part of their education in a partner institution abroad, or continue the study at a partner university abroad after finishing a degree at Gjøvik.

Research 

Gjøvik University College is a research-intensive university college. For a number of years it has had the highest result-based research funding per employee of the university colleges, and has secured 48% of EU's research funds going to the university colleges in Norway . It has PhD programs in Computer Science and Information Security. The University College has a number of research labs, some of them unique in Scandinavia, including:

 Center for Care Research
 Norwegian Research Laboratory for Universal Design
 Norwegian Information Security Laboratory (NISlab)
 Norwegian Biometrics Laboratory
 Testimon Forensic Laboratory
 Media Technology Laboratory (MTL)
 The Color and Media Computing Laboratory

The university colleges in Norway represent a broad range in areas of foci and level of research intensity.  By Norwegian law, an academic institution needs four accredited PhD programs to apply for accreditation as a university.

References
 Gjøvik University College (English)

Universities and colleges in Norway
Education in Innlandet
Gjøvik
Educational institutions established in 1994
1994 establishments in Norway